Roy Emerson and John Newcombe won in the final 6–2, 6–3, against Arthur Ashe and Robert Lutz.

Seeds
Seeds unavailable.

Draw

Draw

External links
 Draw

Doubles